The Needle of Ryswick or Rijswijk is an obelisk in Rijswijk, the Netherlands, commemorating the Treaty of Ryswick (September 1697).

The monument is at the location of the Huis ter Nieuwburg, the palace where the peace treaty was signed. It was built of materials from Huis ter Nieuwburg in 1792 to 1794. The palace was demolished in 1790 due to neglect.

External links
  The Needle of Rijswijk at the municipal website

Buildings and structures in Rijswijk
Obelisks in the Netherlands
Cultural infrastructure completed in 1794
1794 establishments in the Dutch Republic
18th-century architecture in the Netherlands